Gastón Otreras (born August 24, 1985 in Buenos Aires, Argentina) is an Argentine retired footballer.

Career
Otreras is a graduate of Boca Juniors, but was unable to break into the first team. His professional career started in 2006, playing with Argentine Second Division club Huracán de Tres Arroyos. In Summer 2007, after Huracán dropped to the Third Division, Otreras moved to Uruguayan side Central Español, a team based in the capital city, Montevideo. During the season spent in Uruguay, he played 28 matches in the Uruguayan Primera División (22 in the starting line), scoring 2 goals and finishing 13th in the aggregate table.

In July 2008, he was signed by the Mexican side Club Tijuana playing in the Liga de Ascenso. He won the 2010 Apertura, and later in 2011 achieved the promotion with his team to the Mexican Primera División. 
Immediately after promotion of  Tijuana to the first division, Otreras signed a loan deal with Uruguayan side Bella Vista. After only six months, however, he returned to Mexico, where he joined Second Division side C.F. La Piedad.

In August 2012, he signed a new deal and agreed to return to Central Español.

References

External links
 
 

1986 births
Living people
Argentine footballers
Argentine expatriate footballers
Central Español players
C.A. Bella Vista players
Club Tijuana footballers
Juventud de Las Piedras players
Huracán de Tres Arroyos footballers
La Piedad footballers
Aldosivi footballers
Club Atlético Fénix players
Uruguayan Primera División players
Primera Nacional players
Primera B Metropolitana players
Ascenso MX players
Association football midfielders
Argentine expatriate sportspeople in Mexico
Argentine expatriate sportspeople in Uruguay
Expatriate footballers in Mexico
Expatriate footballers in Uruguay
People from Quilmes
Sportspeople from Buenos Aires Province